Mohamed Seghir Babes (March 10, 1943–March 7, 2017 in Algiers) was the Algerian minister for health and population in the 1992 government of Belaid Abdessalam.

References

1943 births
2017 deaths
Algerian politicians
Place of birth missing
21st-century Algerian people
Health ministers of Algeria